Wólka Panieńska  is a village in the administrative district of Gmina Zamość, within Zamość County, Lublin Voivodeship, in eastern Poland.

References

Villages in Zamość County